A "purchasing cooperative" is a type of cooperative arrangement, often among businesses, to agree to aggregate demand to get lower prices from selected suppliers. Retailers' cooperatives are a form of purchasing cooperative. Cooperatives are often used by government agencies to reduce costs of procurement. Purchasing Cooperatives are used frequently by governmental entities, since they are required to follow laws requiring competitive bidding above certain thresholds. In the United States, counties, municipalities, schools, colleges and universities in the majority of states can sign interlocal agreements or cooperative contracts that allow them to legally use contracts that were procured by another governmental entity. The National Association of State Procurement Officials (NASPO) reported increasing use of cooperative purchasing practices in its 2016 survey of state procurement. NASPO has noted the increasing popularity of cooperative purchasing but also recognises that, like any practice, "it can be done well - or poorly".

Examples
An example of a purchasing cooperative is Harris County's Department of Education (HCDE) in Texas, which has created three procurement cooperatives:
Choice Facility Partners, a facility services cooperative which serves government bodies throughout Texas and elsewhere in the United States 
Gulf Coast Cooperative, a food cooperative primarily serving schools, and
HCDE Purchasing Cooperative, offering more than 275 vendor contracts for commodities.

Various schools, colleges and universities, municipalities, counties, municipal utility districts and other governmental entities sign an interlocal contract with HCDE, thus becoming members that can access any of the multitude of competitively bid and legally awarded contracts available through their cooperatives. To optimize processes, these three cooperatives were combined into Choice Partners national cooperative in 2012. Through use of Choice Partners, HCDE generates revenues to support the school districts within Harris County.

In a similar way, Catholic parishes in the Archdiocese of Cincinnati, Ohio, have established a cooperative purchasing process to combine buying power and reduce costs.

Missouri State Statutes (Chapter 34, Chapter 37 and Chapter 67) authorize the State's Division of Purchasing to conduct a cooperative purchasing program, and allow eligible local governments, political subdivisions, and quasi-public governmental bodies to participate in the program.

Costs
Many cooperative purchasing programs levy charges for usage and access. Fees may be assessed as an annual enrolment fee or a transaction fee such as a levy of 1% or 2% on the value of every purchase.

References

Cooperatives